Tarentum may refer to: 
 Taranto, Apulia, Italy, on the site of the ancient Roman city of Tarentum (formerly the Greek colony of Taras)
See also History of Taranto
 Tarentum (Campus Martius), also Terentum, an area in or on the edge of the Campus Martius in Rome
 Tarentum, Pennsylvania, United States
 Tarentum Bridge, in the above place 
 ST Tarentum, a tug in service with Società Rim. Napoletani (1962–82); originally known as Empire Bess

See also